Charles Richard Allen (September 7, 1939 – December 14, 2016) was an American professional football player.  He was a linebacker who played in the American Football League (AFL) with the San Diego Chargers, and later the National Football League (NFL) with the Pittsburgh Steelers and Philadelphia Eagles.  He played in four AFL Championship games (1961, 1963, 1964, and 1965), and was a member of the Chargers' 1963 AFL Championship team.  Allen was an All-AFL player in 1961, and an AFL Western Division All-Star in 1961, 1963, and 1964.

After football
Allen went on to serve as the Vice President of Football Operations for the Seattle Seahawks for 20 years.  The high school football stadium of Cle Elum Roslyn High School in Allen's hometown of Cle Elum, Washington is named in his honor: "Chuck Allen Field."

He died on December 14, 2016 at home.

See also
 List of American Football League players

References

 

1939 births
2016 deaths
American football linebackers
Pittsburgh Steelers players
Philadelphia Eagles players
San Diego Chargers players
Seattle Seahawks executives
Washington Huskies football coaches
Washington Huskies football players
American Football League All-Star players
American Football League All-League players
People from Cle Elum, Washington
Players of American football from Washington (state)
American Football League players